Oswaldo Felipe Ramírez Salcedo (born March 28, 1947, in Lima, Callao) is a retired Peruvian football striker. He is one of the highest scoring players in the history of the Copa Libertadores and on the Peru national football team, which won the 1975 Copa América.

Club career
Ramírez started his career with Sport Boys in 1966. In 1968 he was the top scorer in the Peruana Primera División.

In 1969, Oswaldo "Cachito" Ramirez scored two historic goals against Argentina in the Bombonera (Argentina). This allowed Peru to compete in the 1970 Mexico World Cup and eliminated Argentina from the competition.

In 1970, he joined Universitario de Deportes and won the league title in 1971 and 1974.

From 1975 to 1977, he played for Atletico Espanol (Mexico).

In 1977 Ramírez returned to Peru to play for Sporting Cristal and won the Peruana Primera División championship in 1979 and 1980, being top scorer in 1980.

A short spell with Deportivo Galicia (Venezuela), was followed by Ramírez's return to Sporting Cristal. He then retired in 1982.

Ramírez scored a total of 26 goals in the Copa Libertadores making him the 8th highest scoring player overall and the highest scoring Peruvian in the history of the tournament.

Club titles

Individual awards

Peruana Primera División: Top Scorer 1968, 1980
Copa Libertadores: Top Scorer 1972, 1975

International career

Ramírez played a total of 57 games for Peru, scoring a total of 17 goals, representing them at the 1970 FIFA World Cup and won the Copa América 1975.

Ramírez's 17 goals for Peru made him the 5th highest scorer in the history of the Peru national football team.

International title

External links
Copa de Campeones y Subcampeones CONCACAF 1975

References

1947 births
Living people
Footballers from Lima
Peruvian footballers
Association football forwards
Peru international footballers
1970 FIFA World Cup players
1975 Copa América players
Peruvian Primera División players
Liga MX players
Sport Boys footballers
Sporting Cristal footballers
Atlético Español footballers
Expatriate footballers in Mexico
Expatriate footballers in Venezuela
Peruvian expatriate sportspeople in Mexico
Peruvian expatriate sportspeople in Venezuela
Club Universitario de Deportes footballers
Peruvian expatriate footballers
Copa América-winning players